Morebilus is a genus of spiders in the family Trachycosmidae found in southern and western Australia, first described by Norman I. Platnick in 2002. These are large spiders, with the carapace of males ranging from 10 to 16 millimeters and those of females ranging from 10 to 24 millimeters. They look similar to members of Rebilus, especially the spinneret and tarsal claw, but members of this genus have an inclined lip at the anterior edge of the sternum as well as a pair of enlarged sclerites on the coxal glands.

Species
, it contains 13 species:

Morebilus blackdown Platnick, 2002 – Queensland
Morebilus coolah Platnick, 2002 – New South Wales
Morebilus diversus (L. Koch, 1875) – Northern Australia
Morebilus fitton Platnick, 2002 – South Australia
Morebilus flinders Platnick, 2002 – South Australia, Victoria
Morebilus fumosus (L. Koch, 1876) – Queensland
Morebilus gammon Platnick, 2002 – South Australia
Morebilus gramps Platnick, 2002 – Victoria
Morebilus graytown Platnick, 2002 – South Australia, Victoria
Morebilus nipping Platnick, 2002 – Queensland
Morebilus plagusius (Walckenaer, 1837) – New South Wales, Victoria
Morebilus swarbrecki (Dunn & Dunn, 1946) – Victoria
Morebilus tambo Platnick, 2002 – Queensland

References

Trochanteriidae
Araneomorphae genera
Spiders of Australia